Resni.ca is a Slovenian political party, founded on 14 January 2021, and led by Zoran Stevanović. The party organized protests against the introduction of the "recovered, vaccinated, tested" measure for limiting the COVID-19 pandemic, which contributed to its visibility. The party's stated central issues are fighting corruption, national sovereignty, reducing taxes, opposition to COVID-19 pandemic lockdown measures, and reducing budget deficits and public debt.

Overview 
On 14 January 2021, the Resni.ca Citizens' Movement party was formed by Kranj City Councilor Zoran Stevanović and other like-minded individuals. The party is headquartered in Kranj.

According to Stevanović, its name represents the words "truth" (resnica) and "serious" (resni); the party represents truth (in contrast to the corrupt main political parties, which divide citizens into left- and right-wingers as they jostle to control public funds) and is serious about carrying out their goals. According to Stevanović, it was founded after requests by supporters. In a February 2021 interview, Stevanović said that the party had at least 37,000 "ambassadors" and "many more" supporters across the country. It was establishing a network of party representatives across Slovenia; contesting the upcoming parliamentary elections was the party's "first-order ambition", and it intended to stand in local and European elections. According to Stevanović, Resni.ca was not backed by any "lobbies or other power structures, which is also reflected in the fact that the mainstream media does not pay us even a second of attention ... I was called by journalists I know personally, who told me they had received instructions from their editors-in-chief that it was forbidden to report about us." According to the results of a Mediana poll, the newspaper Delo concluded in October 2021 that the party had little electoral potential.

In a December 2020 interview, Stevanović said that he wrote to Prime Minister Janez Janša to propose that Resni.ca and the government cooperate in finding solutions to ongoing challenges. He was active in Kranj municipal politics before the party was founded, standing twice for mayor and winning the same number of council seats with his Zoran Za Kranj electoral list as the local Slovenian Democratic Party (SDS) in the second election. Stevanović spoke at the January 2021 Kranj City Council session as a representative of Resni.ca, but did not answer a question about whether the party was the legal successor of the municipal Zoran Za Kranj list.

A former member of the Slovenian National Party (SNS), Stevanović said that he was invited to join the SNS in 2016 by party leader Zmago Jelinčič with promises to overhaul the party and fight corruption but soon realized that the party was "Jelinčič's personal political firm" and called his SNS membership a mistake. In 2018, as an SNS representative, he participated in a roundtable discussion on patriotism organized by the far-right Institute for Patriotic Values which was also attended by Andrej Šiško and SDS MP Branko Grims. A key Resni.ca figure also co-founded the far-right Homeland League party.

Resni.ca's increased visibility fueled speculation that the party might be a Slovenian Democratic Party satellite or Trojan horse, with which the SDS could secure enough parliamentary support for a coalition government under SDS leadership.

History 
The party was founded on 14 January 2021, headquartered in Kranj with Stevanović as party leader. On 3 October 2021, Stevanović wrote to the Slovenian government calling for the repeal of the "recovered, vaccinated, or tested" (RVT) measure and the resignation of the government. Stevanović wrote that the government bears "all responsibility for what is happening on the streets, squares and protocol locations", hinting that RVT protests might disrupt the EU-Western Balkans summit in Brdo pri Kranju. The following day, he met with the President Borut Pahor at the presidential palace. Pahor expressed his expectation that Stevanović would instruct the protesters to adhere to non-violence, and warned him that protesters choosing where they would protest was unacceptable. Stevanović suggested that Pahor call on the government to resign and lift its RVT measure, which the president rejected. Stevanović attended the meeting without a face covering.

On the morning of 7 October, the National Bureau of Investigations directed searches of party headquarters and Stevanović's home. Stevanović reportedly surrendered to police. The following day, The Reporter magazine said that it had received a written request from Resni.ca to withdraw a photograph of Stevanović's house. The letter threatened a lawsuit, but The Reporter said that filming or photographing private real estate from public areas was prohibited; the media routinely publishes such images during house searches, however, but The Reporter was not one of the media outlets which published pictures of Stevanović's house.

Ideology 
In Resni.ca's draft constitution, the party identified its core principles as the fight against corruption, opposition to political servility to the EU, opposition to "theft of funds through high taxes and excise duties", opposition to increasing government debt, opposition to "misappropriation of public funds", advocacy for higher wages and greater purchasing power of citizens, "improved conditions in health care and public administration" and "elimination of injustices suffered by our citizens". Stevanović said in a February 2021 interview that the party's goals were "ridding the country of corruption, establishing sovereignty, reducing taxes, increasing salaries by lowering of taxes and contributions, reforming the healthcare system from a state-administered one to a public one, increasing pensions, revitalizing the administrative state, and starting to reduce external debt."

Populism
Stevanović said in a December 2020 interview that he met the dictionary definition of a populist (someone "advocating something that is liked by the broad public"), and did not see populism as negative despite the term's negative political connotation. In a February 2021 interview, he said that the party's candidates would be "nominated by citizens" and prospective candidates had to prove that they had never been criminally convicted or involved in ongoing criminal proceedings. Stevanović expressed his belief that "[in Slovenia] we don't really have a left or a right wing. It's just two poles that falsely divide people based on attitudes towards recent history and marginal topics. So it's two wings of the same bird of prey, with one and the same interest, namely the control of public funds ..."

Economy 
In a December 2020 interview about the party's goals, Stevanović proposed that Slovenia become a tax haven and said that the party advocated a €300 universal basic income which would replace existing social assistance and encourage citizens to seek employment.

Party program
Resni.ca's party program is:
 Fight corruption and economic crime - fight corruption through legislative change and the establishment of departments in the prosecutor's office and police and a special court for the speedy evaluation of corruption cases, abolish the statute of limitations for economic crimes, suspend and audit all potentially-corrupt infrastructure projects, audit all major privatizations of state-owned companies
 Souvereignism in relation to international organizations, "re-evaluation of Slovenia's status in the EU, ECB, UN and NATO systems", "moratorium on the adoption and implementation of binding or principled international acts, especially if they are not in accordance with the Slovenian Constitution, national legislation, or were not approved by referendum"
 Reduction of public debt to avoid bankruptcy and dependence on international organizations, elimination of the budget deficit and enshrining balanced state budgets in the constitution
 Reduction of taxes and duties - reduction of the average effective tax rate (initially to 33 percent), abolition of progressive taxation and introduction of a flat tax, "significant increase in wages through lowering taxes and contributions", "reduction of all taxes", reduction of excise duties on energy, abolition of climate taxes, real-estate taxes and other "unjust taxes"
 Pension reform - significant increase in pensions at the expense of funds saved through the elimination of corruption and "vitalization of the state administration", reorganization of the pension system, "overhauling of the exceptional pensions system"
 Ending compulsory vaccination
 Reorganization of NGO funding
 Reorganization of public institutions and agencies
 Abolition of all welfare payments and introduction of universal basic income as a replacement for welfare payments
 Tightening conditions for acquiring citizenship, linking social rights to citizenship, "abolition of privileges for certain social groups and minorities and making all citizens of the Republic of Slovenia equal before the law", adoption of measures to prevent abuses of asylum legislation
 Reorganization of the labor market, ensuring a competitive labor market for Slovenian citizens
 Reorganization of the Slovenian Army, training of the SAF for territorial operation in Slovenia instead of within NATO
 Reorganization of the judiciary
 Decriminalization of cannabis
 Protection of key natural resources (such as water) and ban on their privatization; promotion of organic farming, restriction of the use of plant-protection products in agriculture, promotion of the reprocessing of "waste plastics into petroleum products", promotion of wood management, promotion of economic hemp, promotion of hemp biodiesel as an alternative to fossil-fuel imports
 Introduction of direct democracy, including e-elections and e-referendums, changing the electoral system in accordance with the Constitutional Court
 Reform of the public education system and curricula, emphasizing higher education
 Moratorium on the introduction of the 5G system "until all the effects of the technology on human health are fully clarified"
 Preserving the vintage highway system
 Unconditional freedom of speech

Electoral results

National Assembly

Presidential

See also 
 List of political parties in Slovenia

References

External links 
 Party website

2021 establishments in Slovenia
Anti-vaccination organizations
Nationalist parties in Slovenia
Organizations established for the COVID-19 pandemic
Political parties established in 2021